Marcus Liberty (born October 27, 1968) is an American former professional basketball player. He played four seasons in the National Basketball Association (NBA). Liberty played college basketball for the University of Illinois.

High school
After leading Chicago's Crane High School Cougars to a city title as a freshman, Liberty transferred to Chicago's King College Prep High School for his sophomore through senior seasons from 1984 to 1987.  During his time at King, Liberty led his basketball teams to an IHSA State Championship in 1986 and a second-place finish in 1987.  During the 1987 tournament run, Liberty scored 41, 23, 38 and 41 points consecutively.  His 143-point effort during that tournament stands as a class AA record in the state of Illinois. He was named a McDonald's All-American in 1987, as well as the Parade Player of the Year.

In 2007, Liberty was voted one of the "100 Legends of the IHSA Boys Basketball Tournament," recognizing his superior performance in his appearances in the tournament. He was considered the top senior prep player in the nation by Sports Illustrated.

College and NBA
Liberty played collegiately at the University of Illinois, and was a member of the team that advanced to the 1989 NCAA Final Four. That Fighting Illini team gained the moniker "Flyin' Illini" by Dick Vitale while broadcasting a game during the 1988–89 season.  Along with Liberty, the other members of that team included Nick Anderson, Kendall Gill, Stephen Bardo, Kenny Battle, and Lowell Hamilton. He was then selected by the Denver Nuggets in the 2nd round (42nd overall) of the 1990 NBA Draft. A 6'8" (2.03 m) and 205 lb (93 kg) small forward, Liberty played for the Nuggets and Detroit Pistons in 4 NBA seasons. His best year as a pro was during the 1991-92 NBA season when he appeared in 75 games for the Nuggets, averaging 9.3 ppg.

References

External links
basketpedya.com
Marcus Liberty NBA statistics, basketballreference.com
IHSA All-State List

1968 births
Living people
AEK B.C. players
American expatriate basketball people in Chile
American expatriate basketball people in Greece
American expatriate basketball people in Japan
American expatriate basketball people in Sweden
American expatriate basketball people in the Dominican Republic
American expatriate basketball people in the Philippines
American expatriate basketball people in Turkey
American men's basketball players
Denver Nuggets draft picks
Denver Nuggets players
Detroit Pistons players
Illinois Fighting Illini men's basketball players
Jämtland Basket players
Las Vegas Silver Bandits players
McDonald's High School All-Americans
Parade High School All-Americans (boys' basketball)
Rapid City Thrillers players
Small forwards
Basketball players from Chicago
Alaska Aces (PBA) players
Philippine Basketball Association imports
Pop Cola Panthers players
Polluelos de Aibonito players